Ekans - Snakes Awake also known as Ekans - Ek Se Badhkar Snake or simply Ekans is an Indian sci-fi superhero computer - animated series produced by Hi-Tech Animation for Cartoon Network (India). The series centers around 13-year-old Ekans, whose name spelled backward would be "S, N, A, K, E". He has the ability to control snakes in form of robots and can also tackle real ones as well.

It is the first Cartoon Network Indian original computer - animated series.

Premise 
The series revolves around a 13-year-old street-smart wunderkind, Ekans, who is chosen as the one and is gifted a nagamani by the world's most powerful snakes, thanks to his heart of gold and fearless attitude. With extraordinary snake-like powers, the otherwise conventional tech-savvy youngster obtains heightened sensory perceptions, ability to camouflage, flexibility, and strength to keep humanity safe from the evils of the world. That's not all; his trendy hi-tech superpower suit with mechanical snakes gives him additional abilities to cleverly outsmart villains.

The concept of snake-based powers in the series is derived from an old Indian legend revolving around snakes. In the legend, a community of snakes were granted sentience and powers such as metanmorphosis by a magical stone called the Nagamani (lit. Serpent Gem).

Characters

Main characters 
 Ekans
 Chiku
 Kiara
 Diya
 Dr. Sanjay
 Chocho the Robot
 Naagrakshak
 Agent P
 Bunty

Villains 
 Wire Z
 Time Warp
 Dr. I
 Darkstone
 Elastiko
 Worm King
 Froggie
 Kazero
 Sapera
 Chemical King
 Crazy Collector
 Mongoose & Kanjoose
 Chen & Liu
 Octagon
 Gatoroid
 Danger Driller
 Cemento & Mixer
 Hathoda
 Maharoach
 Lathi & Kathi (Sapera's Assistant)

Broadcast  
The series debuted on Cartoon Network on 27 June 2021 with first season titled Ekans - Ek Se Badhkar Snake.

The second season of the series was premiered on 22 November 2021 under the title Ekans - Snakes Awake! on Cartoon Network.

The series also premiered on Cartoon Network Asia in April 25, 2022.

Cartoon Network shifted the series to its sister channel Pogo TV on August 22, 2022.

Specials

Ekans – Origin Story 
On 25 December 2021 Cartoon Network aired a special episode of the series titled Ekans Special: Ekans: Origin Story in the celebration of Christmas. In this special episode, it was revealed how Ekans got his super powers and nagamani. It was also premiered on Pogo with the title Ekans: Origin Story on September 04, 2022.

Movies

Ekans – Hero Ek Villain Anek 
A theatrical film titled Ekans – Hero Ek Villain Anek was released in PVR Cinemas on 19 August 2022 in three languages i.e. Hindi, Tamil and Telugu. The film later premiered on Pogo TV in October 16, 2022.

Ekans – The Mystery Of Three Gems 
Pogo TV launched another feature film of the series titled Ekans – The Mystery Of Three Gems on October 09, 2022. It is also an original film of Pogo TV of Ekans series.

See also 
 List of Indian animated television series

References 

Indian children's animated action television series
Cartoon Network (Indian TV channel) original programming